The 1922 Tour de France was the 16th edition of Tour de France, one of cycling's Grand Tours. The Tour began in Paris with a flat stage on 25 June, and Stage 9 occurred on 11 July with a mountainous stage from Toulon. The race finished in Paris on 23 July.

Stage 9
11 July 1922 — Toulon to Nice,

Stage 10
13 July 1922 — Nice to Briançon,

Stage 11
15 July 1922 — Briançon to Geneva,

Stage 12
17 July 1922 — Geneva to Strasbourg,

Stage 13
19 July 1922 — Strasbourg to Metz,

Stage 14
21 July 1922 — Metz to Dunkerque,

Stage 15
23 July 1922 — Dunkerque to Paris,

References

1922 Tour de France
Tour de France stages